Feminist Studies is a peer-reviewed academic journal covering women's studies that was established in 1972. It is an independent nonprofit publication housed at the University of Maryland in College Park, Maryland. Besides scholarly articles, the journal also publishes creative writing (poetry, fiction, and memoirs), artwork and art essays, book reviews, political and social commentaries, interviews, and activist reports.

Occasionally, special issues are published on topics such as Chicana Studies; Women and Prison; Women's Work, Social Class, and Socialism; Sexuality, Sexual Violence, and Sexual Identities; Culture and History in the New South Africa; the Body and Healthcare; Rethinking the Global; and Conjugality and Sexual Economies in India.

History 
The journal was established in 1972 in New York City by feminist academics and activists who were committed to creating a scholarly journal with high standards and community relevance. This feminist network believed that the women’s movement needed an analytic forum to engage the issues raised by the movement and to bring together the contributions of feminist activists and scholars. Dr. Claire Goldberg Moses, professor emerita of women's studies at the University of Maryland, was the journal’s editorial director for over three decades, running it alongside a collective of scholars in multiple disciplines and locations. The journal continues to be edited by a collective, with Ashwini Tambe now at its helm.

Abstracting and indexing 

According to the Journal Citation Reports, the journal has a 2015 impact factor of 0.520, ranking it 27th out of 40 journals in the category "Women's Studies".

References

External links 
 
 Feminist Studies records at the University of Maryland Libraries.

Women's studies journals
Feminism and society
Feminism in the United States
English-language journals
Publications established in 1972
Women in Maryland
Triannual journals